Coquinal Airport  is an airstrip in the pampa of Beni Department in Bolivia. The runway is off a minor road bordering the wetlands around the Beni River.

See also

Transport in Bolivia
List of airports in Bolivia

References

External links 
OpenStreetMap - Coquinal
OurAirports - Coquinal
Fallingrain - Coquinal Airport
HERE/Nokia - Coquinal

Airports in Beni Department